Finn Askew (born May 21, 2001) is a British musician from Wellington in south-west England.

Finn cites U.S. hip-hop acts such as Juice WRLD and Lil Peep as music influences of his sound though he fell in love with music after uncovering his parents' CDs, a mixture of Nirvana, the Smiths, and the Beach Boys. Finn's music is described as an "indie sound, washed one moment in a rosy hue of pop and the next polished to a high, RnB sheen."

Career 
Finn Askew's debut single "Roses" was created and recorded when he was 16. He got the beat from YouTube and used GarageBand and his £20 microphone to create it. "Roses" featured in a live stream on V Live from Taeyong (member of K-pop band NCT). As a result the track was included in the Spotify viral charts in a number of southeast Asian countries and has over 12 million streams on Spotify alone.

Finn released his debut EP Peach which combines lo-fi hip-hop, piano jazz and indie rock in January 2021.

Finn Askew was listed as one of Vevo Dscvr's Artists To Watch for 2021.

Discography

Extended plays 
 Peach (22 January 2021)

Singles 
 "Roses" (2020)
 "Same Old Love" (2020)

References 

Living people
English hip hop musicians
British indie pop musicians
People from Wellington, Somerset
2001 births
Polydor Records artists